Bakersfield is a city in California.

Bakersfield may also refer to:

Settlements
Bakersfield, Nottingham, UK
Bakersfield, Missouri, US
Bakersfield, Texas, US
Bakersfield, Vermont, US, a New England town
Bakersfield (CDP), Vermont, the central village in the town

Other uses
Bakersfield (album), a 2013 country album by Vince Gill and Paul Franklin
Bakersfield station (disambiguation), stations of the name
Bakersfield sound, genre of country music